Emeishan is a county-level city in Sichuan province, China. It is administered by the prefecture-level city Leshan. Its population in 1990 stood at 396,445. It is named after Mount Emei, a famous mountain located within its administration.

Climate

Transport
Emei railway station
Emeishan railway station

References

External links 
 Emeishan City Website 

County-level cities in Sichuan
Leshan